Ahmed Kasoum (born January 25, 1985) is an Arab-Israeli footballer. He currently plays for Maccabi Tamra.

After playing three professional seasons with Bnei Sakhnin, the club was relegated to the Liga Leumit (2nd tier). Instead of remaining with the club, Kasoum was bought by Hapoel Petah Tikva for a hefty sum of US $170,000. Having suffered a rash of injuries, Kasoum's playing time diminished at Hapoel. Following the club's relegation to the Liga Leumit, he was loaned to F.C. Ashdod, and after he returned to the club for the start of the 2008–09 season, he got back to Bnei Sakhnin in January 2009. 
Right Now, Kasoum is a Bnei Sakhnin player and he scored the most goals that a player in Bnei Sakhnin ever scored in Ligat Ha'al

References 
 

1985 births
Living people
Arab citizens of Israel
Arab-Israeli footballers
Israeli footballers
Israel under-21 international footballers
Association football midfielders
Footballers from I'billin
Bnei Sakhnin F.C. players
Hapoel Petah Tikva F.C. players
F.C. Ashdod players
Hapoel Acre F.C. players
Hapoel Nof HaGalil F.C. players
Maccabi Ironi Tamra F.C. players
Hapoel Kaukab F.C. players
Israeli Premier League players
Liga Leumit players